Sainte-Angèle-de-Monnoir is a municipality in the Canadian province of Quebec. The population as of the Canada 2011 Census was 1,812. It is located within the Rouville Regional County Municipality in the Montérégie region about 18 kilometers east of Chambly.

Demographics

Population
Population trend:

Language
Mother tongue language (2006)

Education

The South Shore Protestant Regional School Board previously served the municipality.

See also
List of municipalities in Quebec

References

Incorporated places in Rouville Regional County Municipality
Municipalities in Quebec